In the politics of England, a Liberal Democrat–Green Party alliance is an ad-hoc arrangement between candidates and elected representatives from the Liberal Democrats and Green Party to form a joint group on elected bodies or to field joint lists or candidates in elections.

Instances

Richmond upon Thames London Borough Council
For the 2018 local elections, Liberal Democrats and Green candidates in Richmond upon Thames formed an arrangement where the two parties would field joint lists of two Liberal Democrats and one Green in some three member wards. This was repeated in the 2022 elections.

General elections 2017 and 2019
In the 2017 general election, the Liberal Democrats and Green Party refrained from standing candidates against each other for certain constituencies in Brighton  and Oxford. Such informal arrangements ensured the successful re-election of the only Green MP Caroline Lucas for Brighton Pavilion and resulted in the Liberal Democrats regaining Oxford West and Abingdon as Layla Moran was elected there.

During the 2019 general election, this was extended to more constituencies, as part of the Unite to Remain campaign in order to boost each other's chances of winning those seats.

Oxfordshire County Council
Liberal Democrat and Green councilors elected to Oxfordshire County Council following the local elections in May 2021, formed a joint group prior to negotiations to form a coalition administration also including the Labour Party. These councillors sit in a grouping formally known as the Liberal Democrat Green Alliance. The leader of this group, and of the council, is Liz Leffman.

Official party policies

Liberal Democrat policy
The Liberal Democrats are officially opposed to alliances, with senior party figures preferring a non-aggression pact with Labour over unilaterally standing down.

See also
Progressive alliance (UK)
SDP–Liberal Alliance
Lib–Lab pact

References

Liberal Democrats (UK)
Green Party of England and Wales
Political party alliances in the United Kingdom